Energy in Sweden describes energy and electricity production, consumption and import in Sweden. Electricity sector in Sweden is the main article of electricity in Sweden. The Swedish climate bill of February 2017 aims to make Sweden carbon neutral by 2045. The Swedish target is to decline  emission of climate gases 63% from 1990 to 2030 and international transportation excluding foreign flights 70%. By 2014 just over half of the country's total final energy consumption in electricity, heating and cooling and transport combined was provided by renewables, the highest share amongst the 28 EU member countries. About a third of Sweden's electricity is generated by nuclear power. In generating a year's worth of this energy, Swedes generate about 4 tonnes of  emissions each. Since 2010, sustainability measures have reduced total emissions even as the population has increased.

Swedish government climate and environment investment budget will be ca 1.3 billion euros in 4 years 2017 - 2020 in non fossil travel, renewable energy and international (Annually in Swedish krona: 1.8 billion 2017, 1.5 billion 2018, 4.5 billion 2019  & ca 5 billion 2020.) 

In 2011, the World Energy Council gave Sweden, France, and Switzerland top marks for their energy sustainability.
In 2017 the share of energy from renewable sources in Sweden was 55% in energy use, 69% in heating and cooling, 66% in electricity and 27% in transports. In 2019, 97% of the energy used for public transport was renewable.

Overview

The emissions decline 7.7% in 2008–2009 was at least partly influenced by the European economic recession of 2008–2009 and not only by the sustainable changes in energy consumption. From 2008 to 2009 the change in the US was a 7.0% decline and in Canada was a 9.6% decline.

A report was published in 2011 by the World Energy Council in association with Oliver Wyman, entitled Policies for the Future: 2011 Assessment of Country Energy and Climate Policies, which ranks country performance according to an energy sustainability index. The best performers were Switzerland, Sweden and France.

Buildings and the residential sector currently account for 40 percent of Sweden's energy consumption. Buildings have a long life-span. Thus, energy efficiency is important for houses being built. Better energy efficiency for existing buildings is the biggest challenge.

Renewable energy 

Within the context of the European Union's 2009 Renewables Directive, Sweden was working towards reaching a 49% share of renewable energy in gross final consumption of energy - electricity, heating/cooling, and transportation - by 2020. 
Eurostat reported that Sweden had already exceeded the Directive's 2020 target in 2014 reaching 52.6% of total final energy consumption provided by renewables, up from 38.7% in 2004.
This makes Sweden the leading country within the EU-28 group in terms of renewable energy use by share, followed by Finland and Latvia at 38.7%, Austria at 33.1% and Denmark on 29.2%. 
The two other signatories of the directive, Iceland and Norway, remain ahead of Sweden at 77.1% and 69.2% respectively.

The 2014 52.6% overall share of final energy consumption in Sweden breaks down as renewable energy providing the following shares to each sector: 68.1% of the heating and cooling sector, 63.3% of the electricity sector and 19.2% of the transport sector.

The share of renewable electricity use is high in Sweden. Hydro, wind, and solar power together accounted for 49.8% of the electricity produced in the country in 2014. When measured against national electricity consumption, the share rises to 55.5%. Since 2003, Sweden has supported renewable energy in the electricity sector with a "green electricity certificate" obligation for retail power suppliers. The current plan of the certificate system is to support 25 TWh of new renewable electricity generation by 2020.

In June 2016, the Swedish center-left minority coalition government reached a cross-party energy deal with three opposition parties (the Moderate Party, Centre Party (Sweden), and Christian Democrats (Sweden)), with the agreement targeting 100% renewable electricity production by 2040.

In 2013 renewable energy investment was more than US$1 billion in Sweden.

Wind power 

Wind power accounted for 10% of the electricity generated in Sweden in 2015, up from 5% in 2012 and 2.4% in 2010.

Sweden has wind power potential of 510 TWh/a at land and 46 TWh/a at sea. Consumption was 140 TWh of power in 2010.

In 2013 Sweden was second top country for wind power capacity per inhabitant in the world: 488 W per person, only surpassed by Denmark (863 W per person). In correlation one must note that Swedish use of energy per inhabitant is much higher than average in Europe.

Wave power 
Sweden has a wave power station outside Lysekil run by Uppsala University. The wave energy research group at Uppsala University study and develop all different aspects of wave energy, ranging from power systems and generators, to hydrodynamical modelling, and environmental impact of wave energy parks.

Hydroelectric power 

Hydroelectric power accounts for more than half of Sweden's electricity production. More than 1900 hydroelectric power stations operate across the country. Forty-five produce 100 MW and over, 17 produce 200 MW and over, and 5 produce 400 MW and over. The largest station, the Harsprånget hydroelectric power station, is located on the upper Lule River and has a maximum production capacity of 977 MW. The Lule River is also the most productive river, with almost 18% of the Swedish installed capacity. Almost all of the medium to large plants are located in northern Sweden.

Solar power 
While installations have historically been minimal, solar power has been growing quickly in Sweden with the country's cumulative PV capacity nearly doubling in 2014 to 79 MW. Capacity rose further to 205 MW at the end of 2016, and 411 MW at the end of 2018. Market research firm GlobalData predicted in 2019 that Sweden's solar power capacity could rise to 3.2 gigawatts (GW) in 2030. As of 2023, Sweden's largest solar park is an 18MW facility in Skurup built by solar developer Alight AB, which produces energy for Martin & Servera.

Solar power accounted for roughly 0.3% of the nation's total electricity consumption in 2018.

Biofuels 

Sweden aims for a fossil fuel free vehicle fleet by 2030.

Sweden published the sustainability criteria for biofuels (2011) which consider the areas with high biological values to be protected in respect to fuels production. The feedstock origin used for production of bioliquids in Sweden during 2011 was Sweden 49% The Netherlands 17% United States 17% Finland 6% Belgium 3% and other 8% (Brazil, Malaysia and Russia). Palm oil is often pointed out as a dirty feed-stock for biofuels. None of the Swedish companies used palm oil in 2011. The largest share of feedstock for bioliquids comes from the forest industry in the form of tall oil pitch, tall oil and methanol.

In 2013 the bus fleets in more than a dozen cities relied entirely on biomethane, local plants produced more than 60% of
the total biomethane used in Swedish natural gas vehicles, and more filling stations were opened in 2012 and 2013. Göteborg Energi (Gothenburg Energy) has a 20 MW facility that gasifies forest residues and then converts the synthesis gases—hydrogen and carbon monoxide—into biomethane.

Thermal and nuclear 
Nuclear is dominating in this sector. The other operational plant is, in almost all cases, fueled with renewable fuels. Oil plants are few, and are either decommissioned or used as a reserve,

Nuclear power 

More than 35% of the Swedish electricity is produced by 7 nuclear reactors, spread out on three power stations:
 Ringhals Nuclear Power Plant - 2 Pressurized Water Reactor, ~3,1 GW
 Oskarshamn Nuclear Power Plant - 1 BWR (The largest BWR reactor in the world by energy output), ~1,5 GW
 Forsmark Nuclear Power Plant - 3 BWRs, ~3,2 GW

Before 2005, there were 12 reactors, but two BWR reactors (~1,2 GW) at the Barsebäck nuclear power plant were decommissioned in 1999 and 2005, two BWR reactors at the Oskarshamn Nuclear Power Plant were decommissioned in 2015 and 2017 (~1,1 GW), one PWR reactor was decommissioned at the Ringhals Nuclear Power Plant in 2019. (~1,8 GW). On 31 December 2020 the R1 reactor was permanently shut down.

Decommissioning and waste storage 
Sweden is preparing to dismantle and demolish six large nuclear power reactors on three sites in coming years. It is also working on plans to provide long-term storage of high-level waste.

The total cost of spent fuel storage and decommissioning is estimated at SEK147 billion (around €14 billion). About SEK53 billion (around €5 billion) has been spent to date. This excludes the costs of near-surface disposal facilities for very low-level waste at Ringhals, Oskarshamn, and Forsmark.

The majority of low- and intermediate-level waste will be disposed of in a shallow geological repository for short-lived waste at Forsmark. The country is also exploring the use of transmutation to reduce waste radiotoxicity, with little success.

Global warming 

According to Energy Information Administration the CO2 emissions from energy consumption of Sweden were in 2009 54.77 Mt, slightly below Finland 54.86 Mt, despite the difference in population. The emissions per capita were in Sweden 5.58 and in Finland 9.93 tonnes per capita in 2009.

See also

 Electricity sector in Sweden
 Wind power in Sweden
 Biofuel in Sweden
 Sweden National Renewable Energy Action Plan
 Nordic energy market
 Renewable energy in Norway
 Renewable energy in Finland
 Renewable energy in Denmark
 Renewable energy by country
SYSAV waste-to-energy plant

References

External links
 European Commission National Renewable Energy Action Plans
 European Commission renewable energy Progress Reports
 European Commission National Energy Efficiency Energy Action Plans